North Khorasan Province (Ostān-e Khorāsān-e Shomālī) is one of the 31 provinces of Iran, located in the northeastern part of the country. The capital of the province is the city of Bojnord. North Khorasan is one of the three provinces that were created after the division of Khorasan in 2004. Khorasan was the largest province of Iran until it was divided into three provinces on September 29, 2004. The provinces approved by the parliament of Iran (on May 18, 2004) and the Council of Guardians (on May 29, 2004) were Razavi Khorasan, North Khorasan, and South Khorasan.

At the time of the National Census of 2006, the population of the province was 791,930 in 198,626 households. The following census in 2011 counted 867,727 people in 240,885 households.
In 2014 it was placed in Region 5. At the time of the most recent census in 2016, the population had dropped slightly to 863,092 in 254,747 households.

History 
Greater Khorasan has witnessed the rise and fall of many dynasties and governments in its territory throughout history. Various tribes of Persians, Arabs, Turks, Kurds, Mongols, Turkmens, and Afghans have brought change to the region time and time again.

Ancient geographers of Iran divided Iran into eight segments, of which the largest was the territory of Greater Khorasan. Esfarayen, among other cities of the province, was one of the focal points for settlement by Aryan tribes entering Iran.

The Parthian empire was based near Merv in Khorasan for many years. In Parthian times, Esfarayen was one of the important villages of Nishapur.

During the Sassanid dynasty, the province was governed by a Spahbod (Lieutenant General) called "Padgoosban" and four margraves, each commander of one of the four parts of the province.

In the year 651, the army of Islamic Arabs invaded Khorasan. The territory remained in the hands of the Abbasid clan until 820, followed by the rule of the Iranian Taherid clan in the year 896 and the Samanid dynasty in 900. Khorasan was divided into four parts during the Muslim conquest of Persia, each section being named after the four largest cities; Nishapur, Merv, Herat, and Balkh.

Mahmud of Ghazni conquered Khorasan in 994 and in the year 1037 Tuğrul Beg, the first of the Seljuq empire rulers, conquered Nishapur.

Mahmud Qaznavi retaliated against the invaders several times, and finally, the Qaznavi Turks defeated Sultan Sanjar. But there was more to come, as in 1157 Khorasan was conquered by the Khwarazmids. In 1220 was annexed by the Mongols of Genghis Khan. When in 1226 the great conqueror finally died, Khorasan was inherited by his son Tolui and then by Tolui's son Hulegu, the first emperor of the Mongolic Ilkhanate of Persia.

In the 14th century, a flag of independence was hoisted by the Sarbedaran movement in Sabzevar, and in 1368, Khorasan came into the hands of Tamerlane.

In 1507, Khorasan was occupied by Uzbek tribes. After the death of Nader Shah in 1747, it was occupied by the Afghans.

In 1824, Herat became independent for several years when the Afghan Empire was split between the Durranis and Barakzais. The Persians sieged the city in 1837, but the British assisted the Afghans in repelling them. In 1856, the Persians launched another invasion, and briefly managed to recapture the city; it led directly to the Anglo-Persian War. In 1857 hostilities between the Persians and the British ended after the Treaty of Paris was signed, and the Persian troops withdrew from Herat. Afghanistan reconquered Herat in 1863 under Dost Muhammad Khan, two weeks before his death.

Administrative divisions

Cities 

According to the 2016 census, 484,346 people (over 56% of the population of North Khorasan province) live in the following cities: Ashkhaneh 25,104, Ava 3,993, Bojnord 228,931, Chenaranshahr 3,380, Daraq 4,926, Eivar 3,994, Esfarayen 59,490, Faruj 12,061, Garmeh 10,933, Hesar-e Garmkhan 1,499, Jajarm 19,580, Lujali 1,481, Pish Qaleh 2,001, Qazi 2,428, Qushkhaneh 996, Raz 5,029, Safiabad 3,427, Sankhvast 2,077, Shirvan 82,689, Shoqan 2,313, Titkanlu 3,835, and Ziarat 4,179.

North Khorasan today 

North Khorasan province is one of the most diverse territories in Iran today, largely reflecting the ethnic make-up of Iran. Most people in North Khorasan are Shia Muslims, who are often Khorasani Kurds, Persians, Khorasani Turks and so on, although there is also a small minority of Sunnis who generally are Turkmen There used to be a sizeable population of Lurs inhabiting this province, however, most returned to their native area in western Iran as there are no signs of them in the province today

Previously there used to be a sizeable community of Arabs who settled in the area during the Arab invasion of Iran, however by 1875 they had intermarried so extensively with Persians and Turks that they were indistinguishable, having largely abandoned the Arab language and culture in favour of the local one.

Culture

Attractions 
This province contains many historical and natural attractions, such as mineral water springs, small lakes, recreational areas, caves, and protected regions, and various hiking areas. Most of the historical relics are from the Qajar era, as earthquakes continue to ravage older relics.

The Cultural Heritage Organization of Iran lists 1,179 sites of historical and cultural significance in all three provinces of Khorasan.

Some of the popular attractions of North Khorasan are:

Besh Qardash (five brothers) and Baba-Aman springs
Jameh Mosque of Jajarm

Colleges and universities 

 University of Bojnurd
 Islamic Azad University of Bojnurd
 Eshragh Institute of Higher Education (Bojnurd, North Khorasan)
 Islamic Azad University of Shiravan
 Hakiman Institute of Higher Education (Bojnurd, North Khorasan)
 Khorasan University of Medical Science (Bojnurd, North Khorasan)

Gallery

See also 
 Khorasan
 Greater Khorasan
 Razavi Khorasan
 South Khorasan
 History of Iran

References

External links 
 The text of the law for division of Khorasan into three provinces (in Persian)
 Cultural Heritage Foundation of Khorasan

 
Provinces of Iran